Geoffrey Murdoch (born 3 May 1954) is a New Zealand former cricketer. He played five first-class matches for Otago between 1974 and 1975.

See also
 List of Otago representative cricketers

References

External links
 

1954 births
Living people
New Zealand cricketers
Otago cricketers
Cricketers from Dunedin